Gajara is a village in Achham District in the Seti Zone of western Nepal. At the time of the 1991 Nepal census, the village had a population of 1762 living in 341 houses. At the time of the 2001 Nepal census, the population was 1710, of which 55% was literate.

References

Populated places in Achham District
Village development committees in Achham District